The Second Battle of Homs was fought in western Syria on 29 October 1281, between the armies of the Mamluk dynasty of Egypt and the Ilkhanate, a division of the Mongol Empire centered on Iran. The battle was part of Abaqa Khan's attempt at taking Syria from the Egyptians.

Prelude
After the Mamluk victories over Mongols at Ain Jalut in 1260 and Albistan in 1277, the Il-khan Abaqa sent his brother Möngke Temur at the head of a large army which numbered about 40–50,000 men, chiefly Armenians under Leo II and Georgians under Demetrius II. Homs was the first time that the Mamluks faced the Mongol army at full strength.

On 20 October 1280, the Mongols took Aleppo, pillaging the markets and burning the mosques. The Muslim inhabitants fled for Damascus, where the Mamluk leader Qalawun assembled his forces.

Battle
On 29 October 1281, the two armies met south of Homs, a city in western Syria. In a pitched battle, the Armenians, Georgians and Oirats under King Leo II and Mongol generals routed and scattered the Mamluk left flank, but the Mamluks personally led by Sultan Qalawun destroyed the Mongol centre. Möngke Temur was wounded and fled, followed by his disorganized army. However, Qalawun chose to not pursue the defeated enemy, and the Armenian-Georgian auxiliaries of the Mongols managed to withdraw safely.

Aftermath
The following year, Abaqa died and his successor, Tekuder, reversed his policy towards the Mamluks. He converted to Islam and forged an alliance with the Mamluk sultan.

According to Nicholas Morton, the Battle of Homs was an important turning point in the expansion of the Mongol Empire, as it was the first time that a full-scale Mongol invasion could be repelled on the western frontier.

See also 
First Battle of Homs (1260)

Notes

Bibliography
 
 
 
 
 

Homs 2
1281 in Asia
13th century in the Mamluk Sultanate
Homs
Homs
Homs
Homs 2
Homs 2
1281 in the Mongol Empire